Arzoo Govitrikar is an Indian model and film and television actress.

Personal life 
Arzoo Govitrikar was born in Panvel, Raigad, Maharashtra in a Chitpavan Brahmin family on India and raised in Mumbai. Her elder sister Aditi Govitrikar is an actress and model.
Arzoo studied electronics and telecommunications engineering. She married Siddharth Sabharwal, who works in his family business, and lives in Mumbai and they have a son called Aashman. On 19 February 2019, Arzoo filed a domestic violence case against her husband and sought divorce and custody of her son.

Career

Despite her engineering background, her sister Aditi Govitrikar influenced her to change careers, so she appeared as a model in some commercials and acted in the Malayalam movie Kakkakuyil (2001). Later she appeared in other films and the TV shows Ek Ladki Anjani Si (on Sony), Ghar Ek Sapna, CID and Naagin 2.

Filmography

Television

References

External links 
 

Living people
Indian television actresses
21st-century Indian actresses
Indian film actresses
Indian Hindus
People from Maharashtra
Actresses in Hindi television
Actresses in Hindi cinema
Year of birth missing (living people)
Actresses in Malayalam cinema